Honeybuns is  the seventh album by American pianist and arranger Duke Pearson featuring performances by Pearson's nonet recorded in 1965 and released on the Atlantic label in 1966.

Reception
The Allmusic review by Scott Yanow awarded the album 3 stars stating "Pearson performs music in a style that would have fit in quite well on Blue Note... This is not an essential date, but it is nice to have this rarity back in print again.

Track listing
All compositions by Duke Pearson except as indicated
 "Honeybuns" - 7:07  
 "New Girl" - 5:15  
 "You Know I Care" - 4:08  
 "Is That So?" - 4:15  
 "Our Love" (Buddy Bernier, Larry Clinton, Bob Emmerich) - 4:07  
 "Heavy Legs" - 5:58
Recorded in New York City on May 25 & 26, 1965

Personnel
Duke Pearson - piano, arranger
Johnny Coles - trumpet
Garnett Brown - trombone
Les Spann - flute
James Spaulding - alto saxophone
George Coleman - tenor saxophone
Pepper Adams - baritone saxophone, clarinet  
Bob Cranshaw  - bass
Mickey Roker - drums

References

Atlantic Records albums
Duke Pearson albums
1966 albums
Albums arranged by Duke Pearson
Albums produced by Joel Dorn